Alias Flequillo is a 1963 black-and-white Argentine comedy film directed by Julio Saraceni and written by Abel Santacruz. The film stars José Marrone and Inés Moreno.

Plot
The comic misadventures of a gangster wannabe.

Cast
  Pepe Marrone …Orígenes Buendía / Atilio Degrossi, alias "Flequillo"
  Inés Moreno …La Pelipeli
  Florén Delbene …Comisario Inspector Andrada
  Perla Alvarado …La Floridori
  José de Ángelis …Parodi
  Adolfo García Grau …Oficial Romero
  Eduardo Humberto Nóbili …Juan José, alias "Galanacho"
  Humberto Selvetti …Carmelo, "el Gordo"
  Ricardo Jordán …Efraín Villoldo
  Celia Geraldy …Mujer en comisaría
  José Maurer …Sergio
  Roberto Blanco …Corbata
  Orestes Soriani …Inspector general
  Rafael Chumbita …Secuaz de Parodi
  Luisa Ruiz …Rosita Caporale
  Mario Savino …Caporale
  Raúl Ricutti …Preso
  Carlos Serafino …Locutor en TV
 Míster Chile …Luchador
  Zulma Grey …Mujer en pelea de catch

References

External links
 

1963 films
Argentine black-and-white films
1960s Spanish-language films
1960s crime comedy films
Gangster films
Films directed by Julio Saraceni
Films with screenplays by Abel Santa Cruz
Argentine crime comedy films
1960s Argentine films